Jeffrey Lynn Viken (born August 8, 1952) is a Senior United States district judge of the United States District Court for the District of South Dakota.

Early life and education 

Born in Huron, South Dakota, Viken earned a Bachelor of Arts from the University of South Dakota in May 1974 and a Juris Doctor from the University of South Dakota School of Law in May 1977. He did not take the bar exam as he was admitted to the South Dakota bar under diploma privilege.

Legal career 

From 1977–1981, Viken served as an Assistant United States Attorney for the District of South Dakota and in 1981 became the Acting United States Attorney for the District of South Dakota. From 1981–1982, Viken was a partner in the Rapid City, South Dakota law firm of Finch, Viken & Viken, and then from 1981–1992, Viken was a partner in the Rapid City firm of Finch, Viken, Viken & Pechota. From 1992–2003, Viken served as a partner in the Rapid City law firm of Viken, Viken, Pechota, Leach & Dewell, LLP.

In 2003, Viken was appointed the federal public defender for the District of South Dakota by the United States Court of Appeals for the Eighth Circuit. In 2005, the Eighth Circuit appointed Viken the Federal Public Defender for the District of North Dakota as well to lead a combined-district organization for both North Dakota and South Dakota.

Federal judicial service 

On June 25, 2009, President Barack Obama nominated Viken to a vacant seat on the United States District Court for the District of South Dakota that was created when Judge Lawrence L. Piersol took senior status. The United States Senate confirmed Viken in a 99–0 vote on September 29, 2009. He received his commission the following day. He served as Chief Judge from 2013–2019. He assumed senior status on October 1, 2021.

References

External links

1952 births
Living people
21st-century American judges
Assistant United States Attorneys
Judges of the United States District Court for the District of South Dakota
People from Huron, South Dakota
Public defenders
United States district court judges appointed by Barack Obama
University of South Dakota School of Law alumni